Isham Green Harris (February 10, 1818July 8, 1897) was an American politician who served as the 16th governor of Tennessee from 1857 to 1862, and as a U.S. senator from 1877 until his death. He was the state's first governor from West Tennessee. A pivotal figure in the state's history, Harris was considered by his contemporaries the person most responsible for leading Tennessee out of the Union and aligning it with the Confederacy during the Civil War.

Harris rose to prominence in state politics in the late 1840s when he campaigned against the anti-slavery initiatives of northern Whigs. He was elected governor amidst rising sectional strife in the late 1850s, and following the election of Abraham Lincoln in 1860, persistently sought to sever the state's ties with the Union. His war-time efforts eventually raised over 100,000 soldiers for the Confederate cause. After the Union Army gained control of Middle and West Tennessee in 1862, Harris spent the remainder of the war on the staffs of various Confederate generals. Following the war, he spent several years in exile in Mexico and England.

After returning to Tennessee, Harris became a leader of the state's Bourbon Democrats. During his tenure in the U. S. Senate, he championed states' rights and currency expansion. As the Senate's president pro tempore in the 1890s, Harris led the charge against President Grover Cleveland's attempts to repeal the Sherman Silver Purchase Act.

Early life and career
Harris was born in Franklin County, Tennessee near Tullahoma. He was the ninth child of Isham Green Harris, a farmer and Methodist minister, and his wife Lucy Davidson Harris. His parents had moved from North Carolina to Middle Tennessee in 1806. He was educated at Carrick Academy in Winchester, Tennessee, until he was fourteen. He moved to Paris, Tennessee, where he joined up with his brother William R. Harris, an attorney, and became a store clerk. In 1838, with funds provided by his brother, Harris established his own business in Ripley, Mississippi, an area that had only been recently opened to settlers after a treaty with the Chickasaw Indians.

While in Ripley, Harris studied law. He sold his successful business three years later for $7,000 and returned to Paris where he continued studying law under Judge Andrew McCampbell. On May 3, 1841, he was admitted to the bar in Henry County and began a lucrative practice in Paris. He was considered one of the leading criminal attorneys in the state.

On July 6, 1843, Harris married Martha Mariah Travis (nicknamed "Crockett"), the daughter of Major Edward Travis, a War of 1812 veteran. The couple had seven sons. By 1850 the family had a  farm and a home in Paris. By 1860 their total property was worth $45,000 and included twenty slaves and a plantation in Shelby County.

In 1847, Henry County Democrats convinced Harris to run for the district's Tennessee Senate seat in hopes of countering a strong campaign by local Whig politician William Hubbard. Anti-war comments made in August by the district's Whig congressional candidate, William T. Haskell, damaged Hubbard's campaign, and he quit the race. Harris easily defeated the last minute Whig replacement, Joseph Roerlhoe.  Shortly after taking his seat, he sponsored a resolution condemning the Wilmot Proviso, which would have banned slavery in territories acquired during the Mexican–American War.

In 1848, Harris was an elector for unsuccessful presidential candidate Lewis Cass. In May of that year, he engaged in a six-hour debate in Clarksville with Aaron Goodrich, elector for Zachary Taylor.

Harris was nominated as the Democratic candidate for the state's 9th District seat in the U.S. House of Representatives in 1849. After successfully tying his opponent to unpopular positions of the national Whig Party, Harris won the election easily.  He spent much of his term attacking the Compromise of 1850, though he also chaired the House Committee on Invalid Pensions. Harris was re-elected to a second term, but after Whigs gained control of the state legislature in 1851, his district was gerrymandered, and he did not seek a third term.

Governor of Tennessee
In 1856, Harris was chosen as the presidential elector for the state's at-large district, a position that required him to canvass the state on behalf of Democratic candidate James Buchanan. He largely outshone the district's Whig elector, ex-Governor Neill S. Brown. This campaign elevated Harris to statewide prominence.

In 1857, Tennessee's Democratic governor, Andrew Johnson, was seriously injured in a train accident and was unable to run for reelection. Harris was nominated as his replacement and embarked on a campaign that included a series of debates with his opponent, Robert H. Hatton. With sectional strife in Congress fueling both campaigns, these debates were often heated, and fights frequently broke out among spectators (and in one instance, between Harris and Hatton). Hatton was unable to distance himself from northern abolitionists, and Harris won the election by a vote of 71,178 to 59,807.

Harris's victory was not only the death knell for the state's Know Nothings, who had briefly risen to prominence following the collapse of the national Whig Party, but also represented a shift in Tennessee politics toward the Democratic Party. During the previous two decades, Whigs and Democrats had been evenly matched statewide, with Whigs controlling East Tennessee, Democrats controlling Middle Tennessee, and the two parties evenly split in West Tennessee. The nationwide debate over the Kansas–Nebraska Act and the Dred Scott case pushed the issue of slavery to the forefront in the mid-1850s, and the balance in West Tennessee was tipped in favor of the Democrats.  Harris's 11,000 vote victory was relatively large, considering his predecessor, Johnson, had won by just over 2,000 votes in both 1853 and 1855.

In 1859, Harris ran for reelection against John Netherland, who had been nominated by a hodge-podge group of ex-Whigs, ex-Know Nothings, and disgruntled Democrats, known as the Opposition Party. Harris again campaigned on fears of northern domination, while Netherland argued that the U.S. Constitution provided the best protection for Southern rights, and thus it was in the state's interest to remain in the Union. On election day, Harris prevailed by over 8,000 votes.  The Opposition Party, however, showed its strength by capturing 7 of the state's 10 congressional seats.

Secession and the Civil War

Harris endorsed John C. Breckinridge for president in 1860, and warned that the state must consider secession if the "reckless fanatics of the north" should gain control of the federal government.  Following Lincoln's election in November, Harris convened a special session of the legislature on January 7, 1861, which ordered a statewide referendum on whether or not Tennessee should consider secession. Pro-Union newspapers assailed Harris's actions as treasonous. The Huntingdon Carroll Patriot wrote that Harris was more deserving of the gallows than Benedict Arnold. William "Parson" Brownlow, editor of the Knoxville Whig, particularly despised Harris, calling him "Eye Sham" and "King Harris," and slammed his actions as autocratic. When the referendum was held in February, Tennesseans rejected secession by a vote of 68,000 to 59,000.

Following the Battle of Fort Sumter in April 1861, President Lincoln ordered Harris to furnish 50,000 soldiers for the suppression of the rebellion. Reading his response to Lincoln before a raucous crowd in Nashville on April 17, Harris said, "Not a single man will be furnished from Tennessee," and stated he would rather cut off his right arm than sign the order.  On April 25, Harris addressed a special session of the state legislature, stating that the Union had been destroyed by the "bloody and tyrannical policies of the Presidential usurper," and called for an end to the state's ties to the United States.  Shortly afterward, the legislature authorized Harris to enter into a compact with the new Confederate States of America.

In May 1861, Harris began organizing and raising soldiers for what would become the Army of Tennessee. That same month, a steamboat, the Hillman, which was carrying a shipment of lead to Nashville from St. Louis, was seized by the Governor of Illinois. In response, Harris seized $75,000 from the customs office in Nashville.  On June 8, 1861, Tennesseans voted in favor of the Ordinance of Secession, 104,913 to 47,238. A group of pro-Union leaders in East Tennessee, which had rejected the Ordinance, petitioned Harris to allow the region to break away from the state and remain with the Union. Harris rejected this, and sent troops under Felix K. Zollicoffer into East Tennessee. In the gubernatorial election later that year, William H. Polk, brother of former President James K. Polk, ran against Harris on a pro-Union ticket but was defeated 75,300 to 43,495.

The Union Army invaded Tennessee in November 1861 and had gained control of Nashville by February of the following year. Harris and the state legislature moved to Memphis, but after that city fell, Harris joined the staff of General Albert Sidney Johnston.  At the Battle of Shiloh on April 6, Harris found Johnston slumping in his saddle and asked if he was wounded, to which Johnston replied "Yes, and I fear seriously." Harris and other staff officers moved the general to a small ravine and attempted to render aid, but Johnston died within a few minutes. Harris and the others secretly moved his body to Shiloh Church so as not to dampen the morale of Confederate troops.

Harris spent the remainder of the war as an aide-de-camp on the staffs of various Confederate generals, among them Joseph E. Johnston, Braxton Bragg, John B. Hood, and P. G. T. Beauregard.  Andrew Johnson was appointed military governor by President Lincoln in March 1862, though Harris was still recognized as governor by the Confederacy. In 1863, Tennessee's Confederates elected Robert L. Caruthers as a successor to Harris, but Caruthers never took office. Harris was still issuing edicts as governor as late as November 1864.

After the war, the United States Congress passed a joint resolution allowing the governor of Tennessee to offer a reward for the apprehension of Harris because he was "guilty of treason, perjury and theft". Brownlow, who had become governor, issued a warrant for the arrest of Harris
and placed a $5,000 bounty on him.  Brownlow taunted Harris in the warrant, stating, "His eyes are deep and penetrating—a perfect index to a heart of a traitor—with the scowl and frown of a demon resting upon his brow. His study of mischief and the practice of crime have brought upon him premature baldness and a gray beard." He further noted that Harris "chews tobacco rapidly and is inordinately fond of liquors."

Harris fled to Mexico, where he and several other ex-Confederates attempted to rally with Emperor Maximilian. After Maximilian's fall in 1867, however, Harris was again forced to flee, this time to England.  Later that year, after learning Brownlow would rescind the warrant, Harris returned to Tennessee. Passing through Nashville, he called on Brownlow, who is said to have greeted him with the statement, "While the lamp holds out to burn, the vilest sinner may return."  Afterward, he returned to Memphis to practice law.

United States Senate

By 1877, the Tennessee state legislature, which was once again controlled by Democrats, elected Harris to one of the state's U.S. Senate seats. One of his earliest assignments, in the 46th Congress (1879–81), was the District of Columbia Committee. Subsequent assignments included the Committee on Epidemic Diseases in the 49th Congress through the 52nd Congress (1885–93) and the Committee on Private Land Claims in the 54th Congress (1895–97).

During his first term in the Senate, Harris became the leader of Tennessee's Bourbon Democrats, a wing of the Democratic Party that generally supported laissez-faire capitalism and the gold standard. As such, Harris spent his early Senate career advocating strict constructionism and limited government, states' rights, and low tariffs.  In 1884, he was interviewed by President-elect Grover Cleveland for a cabinet position. In 1887, he gave an impassioned speech in favor of the repeal of the Tenure of Office Act.  In 1890, Harris denounced the Lodge Bill, which would have protected voting rights for African-Americans in the South, arguing that it violated states' rights.

Though a Bourbon Democrat, Harris, representing an agrarian state, was also a "Silver Democrat", believing pro-silver policies protected farmers.  He supported the Bland–Allison Act of 1878, which authorized the federal government to purchase silver to prevent deflation in crop prices. He also supported the act's replacement, the Sherman Silver Purchase Act of 1890.  In 1893, President Cleveland, concerned that the Sherman Act was depleting the U.S. gold supply, sought its repeal. When the vote came up in the Senate in October, Harris, as president pro tempore, launched a filibuster in hopes of preventing the act's repeal, but was unsuccessful. Disgruntled over the repeal of the Sherman Act, Harris campaigned for unsuccessful presidential candidate and gold standard opponent William Jennings Bryan in 1896.

Death

Harris died in office on July 8, 1897. His funeral was held in the Senate chamber of the United States Capitol. Congressman Walter P. Brownlow, a nephew of Harris' old rival Parson Brownlow, was among those who delivered a memorial address in his honor. He is interred at Elmwood Cemetery in Memphis, Tennessee.

See also
 List of governors of Tennessee
 List of United States Congress members who died in office (1790–1899)

Notes

References

Further reading
 Elliott, Sam Davis. Isham G. Harris of Tennessee: Confederate Governor and United Senator. Baton Rouge, LA.:Louisiana State University Press, 2009 
 Hall, Kermit L in The Confederate Governors. edited by Yearns, W. Buck. Athens, Georgia: University of Georgia Press, 1985

External links
 
  Retrieved on 2008-02-13
Governor Isham G. Harris, 1857-1862 at Tennessee State Library and Archives

1818 births
1897 deaths
People from Franklin County, Tennessee
Burials in Tennessee
Albert Sidney Johnston
Confederate States Army officers
Governors of Tennessee
Tennessee state senators
People of Tennessee in the American Civil War
Democratic Party United States senators from Tennessee
Confederate States of America state governors
Democratic Party members of the United States House of Representatives from Tennessee
Democratic Party governors of Tennessee
American slave owners
19th-century American politicians
Presidents pro tempore of the United States Senate
People from Ripley, Mississippi
Bourbon Democrats
Southern Historical Society
United States senators who owned slaves